= Eric A. Spiegel =

American business executive (born 1957)

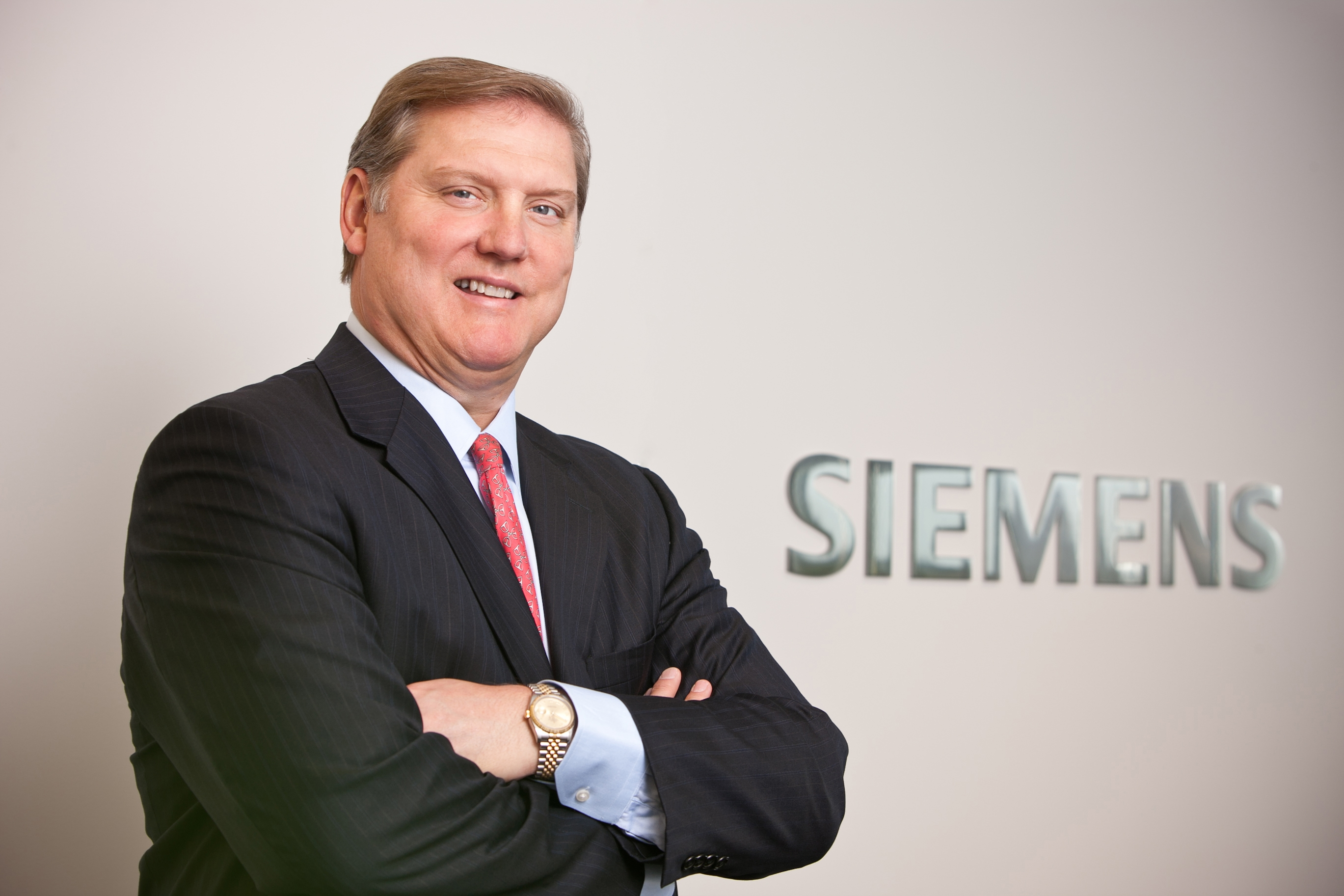
Eric A. Spiegel, Former President and CEO, Siemens USA

Eric A. Spiegel (born September 11, 1957 in Youngstown, Ohio is an American business executive. From January 2010 through December 2016, Spiegel served as president and CEO of Siemens USA, a subsidiary of the Siemens Corporation.

== Biography ==
Spiegel's father owned many business during his childhood, one of them was a construction company. Through that, Spiegel worked at power plants in his youth. He studied Economics and worked at Booz Allen Hamilton in the oil, gas, power, and chemical sector for 23 years. He married Doreen Anderson on July 8, 1989, and has two children: daughter Jessica and son Allan.

== Education ==
Spiegel received an MBA from the Tuck School of Business at Dartmouth College (he was an Edward Tuck Scholar) and his A.B. with Honors in Economics from Harvard University.
